Diogo Alves (1810 – February 19, 1841) was a Portuguese serial killer and robber. Between 1836 and 1840, he killed 70 people. The crimes he committed were all in the area of the Águas Livres Aqueduct, thus earning the title "Aqueduct Murderer". He was sentenced to death and hanged on 19 February  1841, along with one of his accomplices. His head was separated from his body and placed in a flask to preserve it for scientific purposes, and it is now a tourist attraction.

Biography 
Born in Galicia to a peasant family, Alves fell from the family horse while at a young age and hit his head, earning the nickname "Pancada" ("blow"). At the age of nineteen, his parents sent him to work in Lisbon, Portugal. After changing jobs several times and ceasing to write to his parents, he began to drink and gamble, meeting up with innkeeper Maria "Parreirinha" Gertrudes. It is believed that this connection instigated Alves to kill. He began to commit crimes, earning a second nickname "The Aqueduct Murderer". He robbed poor passers-by, and then dumped them from a height of 60 meters to simultaneously avoid identification and present the deaths as suicides, a ploy which initially succeeded.

The murders on the aqueduct remained unproven, but a jury sentenced Alves and his gang for other crimes, in particular, murdering the four family members of a doctor. Maria's 11-year-old daughter, Maria da Conceição, testified in court against the gang. Her mother was eventually sent to a lifelong exile in African colonies.

Alves became the penultimate (often mistakenly claimed to be the last) criminal to be hanged in Portugal. His actions at the time intrigued scientists from the then Medical-Surgical School of Lisbon. After his hanging, in an attempt to study his brain, Alves' head was severed and preserved. However, such intended studies seem to never have happened, given the preserved head does not present any signs of having been examined. It is still preserved in a glass vessel, in a solution of formaldehyde. Scientists could never explain what led him to buy a false key for the Aqueducts, where he was hiding, and how many people he had robbed and killed. The severed head is currently in the anatomical theater of the University of Lisbon's Faculty of Medicine, following the formation of a phrenology cabinet made by José Lourenço da Luz Gomes, which allowed the preservation of Alves' skull, along with that of Matos Lobo (one of the last people to be executed in Portugal) in the old medical-surgical school. The head of Diogo Alves was one of the most significant objects of the passage in One hundred pieces for the Museum of Medicine, which took place in the National Museum of Ancient Art in 2005.

Alves was aided in some of his murders by a man named Celleiro. They were executed together in 1841.

Bibliography 

 Bacchus Marsh collage, Everything I did not want to know (translation and adaptation of Vladimiro Nunes), tinta da china, 2006.
 Portugal — Historical, Corographic, Heraldic, Biographical, Bibliographic, Numismatic and Artistic Dictionary, Volume IV, pp. 599–601..

References 

1810 births
1841 deaths
Spanish mass murderers
Executed mass murderers
Executed Portuguese serial killers
Family murders
Male serial killers
People executed by Portugal by hanging
People executed for murder
People from Galicia (Spain)